The Spencer Gulf Important Bird Area comprises a  strip of coastal land extending for about  along the north-eastern coast of the Spencer Gulf in South Australia. It is considered to be an important site for waders, or shorebirds.

Description
The Important Bird Area (IBA) extends from Tickera Point (also called Myponie Point) immediately north of Wallaroo in the south to Ward Point immediately west of Port Germein in the north.  It also passes close to Port Broughton, and the industrial city of Port Pirie.  About , or over 40%, of the IBA consists of intertidal sand and mudflats used by waders as feeding habitat.  There are also extensive areas of mangroves and salt marshes.

Criteria for nomination as an IBA
The site has been identified by BirdLife International as an IBA because it supports over 1% of the world population of red-necked stints.  Other waders and waterbirds sometimes recorded in significant numbers include red knots, sharp-tailed sandpipers, banded stilts, pied oystercatchers, Australian shovelers and fairy terns.  Chirruping wedgebills and rock parrots have been recorded.  A single sighting of an orange-bellied parrot was made in 1992.

Associated protected areas

See also
List of birds of South Australia

References

Important Bird Areas of South Australia
Spencer Gulf